Edwin Wass (1910 – 4 February 1955) was an English footballer.

Career
Wass was on Chesterfield's books before he moved to York City in September 1931. Within two years, he had established himself in York's first team and for five years he was a regular in the team's defence. He was granted a benefit match in May 1939 against Newcastle United.

Personal life
During World War II, he served in the Royal Navy and suffered serious wounds when his minesweeper was sunk off Crete. He died in 1955.

Notes

1910 births
Footballers from Chesterfield
1955 deaths
English footballers
Association football central defenders
Association football fullbacks
Chesterfield F.C. players
York City F.C. players
English Football League players
Royal Navy personnel of World War II
Shipwreck survivors